Carola Mangiarotti (born 2 May 1952) is an Italian fencer. The daughter of fencer Edoardo Mangiarotti, she competed at the 1976 and 1980 Summer Olympics.

References

1952 births
Living people
Fencers from Milan
Italian female fencers
Olympic fencers of Italy
Fencers at the 1976 Summer Olympics
Fencers at the 1980 Summer Olympics
Mangiarotti family